This is a list of the  games available for Sega's Game Gear handheld video game system. For games that were announced for the Game Gear, but never ended up releasing, see the list of cancelled Game Gear games.

There was an adapter for the Game Gear that allowed it to play Master System games. This article lists only the video games that were conceived for the Game Gear. For games originally released for the Master System, see List of Master System games.

References

 AllGame: Sega Game Gear - Games 

Game Gear

Game Gear